Toluca is a city in Mexico.

Toluca may also refer to:


Places

Mexico
 Toluca Region, an intrastate region within the State of Mexico
 Toluca Valley, the valley where Toluca is located
 Municipality of Toluca, a municipality located in the State of Mexico; see Greater Toluca
 Roman Catholic Archdiocese of Toluca
 Deportivo Toluca F.C.

United States
 Toluca, Illinois, a city
 Toluca, North Carolina, an unincorporated community
 Toluca Lake, Neighborhood in Los Angeles, California
 Toluca, the original name of North Hollywood, Los Angeles, California

Other uses
 Toluca International Airport
 Toluca (meteorite), an iron meteorite found near Toluca

See also
 
 Greater Toluca, the conurbation formed by Toluca
 Toluca Lake, a district in Los Angeles, California